Guin is a city in Marion County, Alabama, United States. It incorporated in December 1889. At the 2020 census, the population was 2,195.

History
Guin takes its name from a young country doctor, Dr. Jeremiah ("Jerry") Guin from Tuscaloosa County, who purchased the farm known then as Haley's Trading Post (where is now situate the town of Guin) from a certain John T. Meador in 1870, and who, in turn, had bought the property from a certain Alan Haley, a newcomer to the State, who had built there a country store on the most used road stretching from north to south, in order to accommodate cattle drovers taking their cattle to market in Columbus and Aberdeen, Mississippi. Jeremiah Guin, while looking for a place to make his home, moved the center of interest about a mile east of Haley's Trading Post (now 12th Street N. and 11 Ave. in present-day Guin).

In the early years of its settlement, a saw mill was built and operated in the town, known originally as Kenney Lumber Company (and later known as Brown Lumber Co.), supplying cut timber to the local community.  

On April 3, 1974, Guin was devastated by a fast moving F5 tornado during the 1974 Super Outbreak, the second-largest tornado outbreak on record. That storm took twenty-three lives.

On July 13, 2010, the citizens of Guin voted to become the first city in Marion County since Prohibition to allow the sale of alcohol.

Geography
Guin is located in southern Marion County at  (33.973135, -87.916711). U.S. Routes 43 and 278 meet in the center of town, leaving it together to the north, while US 43 leads southeast from the city and US 278 leads southwest.

Purgatory Creek runs through the southern part of the city, leading west to Beaver Creek, which continues west to the Buttahatchee River, part of the Tombigbee River watershed.

Demographics

2000 census
At the 2000 census there were 2,389 people in 1,027 households, including 666 families, in the city. The racial makeup of the city was 86.69% White, 11.85% Black or African American, 0.46% Native American, 0.08% Asian, 0.29% from other races, and 0.63% from two or more races. 0.54% of the population were Hispanic or Latino of any race.
Of the 1,027 households 28.7% had children under the age of 18 living with them, 49.1% were married couples living together, 13.7% had a female householder with no husband present, and 35.1% were non-families. 32.7% of households were one person and 16.9% were one person aged 65 or older. The average household size was 2.26 and the average family size was 2.88.

The age distribution was 23.0% under the age of 18, 7.7% from 18 to 24, 25.6% from 25 to 44, 24.1% from 45 to 64, and 19.7% 65 or older. The median age was 40 years. For every 100 females, there were 84.2 males. For every 100 females age 18 and over, there were 79.9 males.

The median household income was $26,618 and the median family income  was $35,174. Males had a median income of $31,019 versus $21,316 for females. The per capita income for the city was $14,690. About 19.2% of families and 20.9% of the population were below the poverty line, including 26.9% of those under age 18 and 18.5% of those age 65 or over.

2010 census
At the 2010 census there were 2,376 people in 1,029 households, including 647 families, in the city. The racial makeup of the city was 86.9% White, 10.9% Black or African American, 0% Native American, 0.1% Asian, 0.6% from other races, and 1.4% from two or more races. 1.3% of the population were Hispanic or Latino of any race.

Of the 1,029 households 25.9% had children under the age of 18 living with them, 42.7% were married couples living together, 16.0% had a female householder with no husband present, and 37.1% were non-families. 34.2% of households were one person and 15.3% were one person aged 65 or older. The average household size was 2.22 and the average family size was 2.81.

The age distribution was 22.8% under the age of 18, 6.7% from 18 to 24, 23.4% from 25 to 44, 26.2% from 45 to 64, and 20.9% 65 or older. The median age was 43.3 years. For every 100 females, there were 86.8 males. For every 100 females age 18 and over, there were 86.7 males.

The median household income was $28,571 and the median family income  was $41,375. Males had a median income of $30,670 versus $27,788 for females. The per capita income for the city was $20,359. About 17.9% of families and 20.6% of the population were below the poverty line, including 26.9% of those under age 18 and 19.2% of those age 65 or over.

2020 census

As of the 2020 United States census, there were 2,195 people, 1,038 households, and 667 families residing in the city.

Education
Guin is a part of the Marion County School system.  Marion County High School houses grades 7-12.  MCHS is the oldest high school in the county.  Guin Elementary School hosts grades K-6.

Athletics
Their mascot is a Red Raider, with their colors being red and white. In 2011, their football team  won the AHSAA (Alabama High School Athletics Association) Class 1A Football championship. In 2012, they were the runner up in the AHSAA 1A Championship. Guin also won the Class 1A Football championship in 1971, 1972, and 1973.

Notable people
 Bud Riley, college football coach, brother of Hayden Riley
 Hayden Riley, head coach of the Alabama Crimson Tide men's basketball and baseball team
 Rece Davis, sports television journalist for ESPN/ABC

References

External links

Cities in Alabama
Cities in Marion County, Alabama
1889 establishments in Alabama